Cochylis tephrodrypta is a species of moth of the family Tortricidae. It is found in Sonora, Mexico.

References

Moths described in 1984
Cochylis